Pedro Soto García (1951 – 27 April 2021) was a Spanish politician who served as a Deputy.

References

Date of birth missing
1951 births
2021 deaths
Spanish politicians